The Ministry of Finance (MOF;) is a ministry of the government of Lebanon.

The following are the Finance Ministers of Lebanon:
Riad El Solh, 25 September 1943 – 3 July 1944
Hamid Franjieh, 3 July 1944 – 9 January 1945
Abdul Hamid Karami, 9 January 1945 – 22 August 1945
Jamil Lahoud, 22 August 1945 – 14 December 1946
Camille Chamoun, 14 December 1946 – 7 June 1947
Mohamad Al Aboud, 7 June 1947 – 26 July 1948
Hussein Al Oweini, 26 July 1948 – 7 June 1951
Philippe Takla, 7 June 1951 – 11 February 1952
Jamil Lahoud, 11 February 1952 – 9 September 1952
Moussa Moubarak, 9–18 September 1952
Bassil Trad, 18–30 September 1952
Georges Hakim, 30 September 1952 – 16 August 1953
Pierre Edde, 16 August 1953 – 1 March 1954
Abdallah El-Yafi, 1 March 1954 – 16 September 1954
Mehiddine Nsouli, 16 September 1954 – 9 July 1955
Pierre Edde, 9 July 1955 – 19 September 1955
Jamil Shehab, 19 September 1955 – 19 March 1956
Georges Karam, 19 March 1956 – 18 November 1956
Nasri Maalouf, 18 November 1956 – 18 July 1957
Jamil Makkawi, 18 July 1957 – 14 March 1958
Pierre Edde, 14 March 1958 – 24 September 1958
Rafik Najjah, 24 September 1958 – 14 October 1958
Rashid Karami, 14 October 1958 – 14 May 1960
Amin Bayham, 14 May 1960 – 1 August 1960
Pierre Gemayel, 10 August 1960 – 31 October 1961
Rashid Karami, 31 October 1961 – 20 February 1964
Amin Bayham, 20 February 1964 – 18 November 1964
Othman El Dannah, 18 November 1964 – 25 July 1965
Rashid Karami, 25 July 1965 – 9 April 1966
Abdallah El-Yafi, 9 April 1966 – 6 December 1966
Rashid Karami, 6 December 1966 – 8 February 1968
Abdallah El-Yafi, 8 February 1968 – 12 October 1968
Pierre Gemayel, 12 October 1968 – 20 October 1968
Abdallah El-Yafi, 20 October 1968 – 15 January 1969
Rashid Karami, 15 January 1969 – 13 October 1970
Elias Saba, 13 October 1970 – 27 May 1972
Fouad Naffah, 27 May 1972 – 8 July 1973
Taki El Din El Solh, 8 July 1973 – 31 October 1974
Khaled Jumblat, 31 October 1974 – 23 May 1975
Luciane Dahdah, 23 May 1975 – 1 July 1975
Rashid Karami, 1 July 1975 – 9 December 1976
Farid Rouphael, 9 September 1976 – 16 July 1979
Ali El Khalil, 16 July 1979 – 7 October 1982
Adel Houmieh, 7 October 1982 – 30 April 1984
Kamil Chamoun, 30 April 1987 – 22 September 1988
Edgar Maalouf, 22 September 1988 – 25 November 1989
Ali El Khalil, 25 November 1989 – 16 May 1992
Asaad Diab, 16 May 1992 – 31 October 1992
Rafik Hariri, 31 October 1992 – 4 December 1998
Georges Corm, 4 December 1998 – 26 October 2000
Fuad Siniora, 26 October 2000 – 26 October 2004
Elias Saba, 26 October 2004 – 19 April 2005
Dimianous Kattar, 19 April 2005 – 19 July 2005
Jihad Azour, 19 July 2005 – 11 July 2008
Mohamad Chatah, 11 July 2008 – 9 November 2009
Raya Haffar al-Hassan, 9 November 2009 – 13 June 2011
Mohammad Safadi, 13 June 2011 – 15 February 2014
Ali Hassan Khalil, 15 February 2014 – 21 January 2020
Ghazi Wazni, 21 January 2020 – 10 August 2020
Source:

References

External links
Official website
Official website 

Finance
Lebanon
1943 establishments in Lebanon